Enrique Rodríguez may refer to:

Enrique Rodríguez (boxer) (1951–2022), Olympic boxer from Spain
Enrique Rodríguez (rugby union) (born 1952), Argentine and Australian rugby union international
Enrique Rodríguez Galindo (1939–2021), brigadier-general in the Spanish Civil Guard 
Enrique Rodríguez Negrón (born 1933), Puerto Rican senator 
Enrique Rodríguez Uresti (born 1962), Mexican politician
Enrique Ramos Rodríguez (born 1932), Mexican politician